Allied Land Command (LANDCOM) formerly Allied Land Forces South-Eastern Europe (LANDSOUTHEAST) is the standing headquarters for NATO land forces which may be assigned as necessary. The Commander LANDCOM is the primary land warfare advisor to Supreme Allied Commander Europe (SACEUR) and the Alliance. When directed by SACEUR, it provides the core of the headquarters responsible for the conduct of land operations. The command is based at Şirinyer (Buca), İzmir in Turkey.

History
NATO has had a headquarters at Izmir for decades. Initially, the body there was Allied Land Forces South-Eastern Europe (LANDSOUTHEAST), responsible to Allied Forces Southern Europe at Naples. Under this command, with its headquarters in Izmir assisted by the subordinate Thessaloniki Advanced Command Post, were to be most of the Greek and Turkish armies in case of war. LANDSOUTHEAST was commanded by a United States Army lieutenant general:
Lieutenant General Willard G. Wyman (1952–54)
Lieutenant General Paul W. Kendall (1954–55)
Lieutenant General George Windle Read Jr. (1955–57)
Lieutenant General Paul D. Harkins (1957–60)
Lieutenant General Harry P. Storke (1960–61)
Lieutenant General Frederic J. Brown II (1961–63)

In 1966 the first major change occurred when French military personnel were withdrawn from LANDSOUTHEAST, followed by the Greek withdrawal in 1974. On 30 December 1977, SHAPE and Turkish military authorities announced another change in the command structure of LANDSOUTHEAST, to be effective 1 July 1978. The command billet was to be filled by a Turkish Army four star general with a U.S. Major General as his deputy. U.S. General Sam S. Walker took command in 1977, and On 30 June 1978, General Walker handed over the command to General , the first Turkish commander. General Akın held command until 30 August 1979.

Construction of a new headquarters facility in Sirinyer, Izmir was completed in March 1994 and LANDSOUTHEAST moved into the facility in April 1994. In July 1994, two German Army officers were assigned to the command for the first time. The headquarters garrison at Sirinyer was named General Vecihi Akin Garrison in March 1996, after the first Turkish LANDSOUTHEAST Commander. Turkish Land Forces General Hüseyin Kıvrıkoğlu commanded LANDSOUTHEAST from c.1993–1996, followed by Hilmi Özkök from 1996–1998.

After the end of the Cold War, for a period the NATO command in Izmir became Joint Command Southeast. After a major NATO reorganisation, the previous southern air component command, Allied Air Forces Southern Europe (AIRSOUTH), in Italy, was disestablished. Thus between 11 August 2004 and 1 June 2013 the new headquarters of NATO's southern air component command, Allied Air Command İzmir, was located at the  İzmir site. The next reorganisation merged the northern and southern air component commands into the single Allied Air Command located at Ramstein Air Base in Germany under a United States Air Force general.

In 2013 the 350-person headquarters took over the responsibilities of Allied Force Command Heidelberg in Germany and Allied Force Command Madrid in Spain, which are being deactivated as part of NATO's transformation.

Role

LANDCOM was created through the North Atlantic Council to ensure the interoperability of NATO land forces, and placed directly under the Supreme Allied Commander Europe to be the leading voice on land issues within the Alliance. It is responsible for providing a deployable land command for a joint operation. LANDCOM will also carry out the planning, conduct and direction of such land operations. What this means is that if a single corps land operation is underway, that corps will probably report to either JFC Brunssum or JFC Naples. If multiple corps are being directed, LANDCOM will direct them for either JFC Brunssum or Naples.

On 26 March 2015, Lieutenant General Ed Davis, Deputy Commander, Allied Land Command, arrived at Headquarters Multinational Corps Northeast (HQ MNC NE) to discuss the ongoing transformation of Multinational Corps Northeast. "The main reason I am here is that Commander LANDCOM has given me the responsibility to lead the evolution of MNC NE and Multinational Division South-East as the two new NATO command organisations which are going to be at the centre of the evolution of the NATO Land Forces," said Lieutenant General Davis.

Romania is leading the process of creating Multinational Division South-East, which will be established in Bucharest, Romania, in 2015–16. The division in Bucharest will be subordinate to the NATO Force Integration Unit also to be established there. The division will reach partial/initial operational capacity in 2016 and Full operational capability (FOC) in 2018.

List of commanders
Since August 2022, the Commanding General, United States Army Europe and Africa has been dual-hatted as Commander, Allied Land Command.

|}

Notes

References

Further reading
John O. Iatrides, 'Failed Rampart: NATO's Balkan Front,' in Mary Ann Heiss (Editor), S Victor Papacosma (Editor), NATO and the Warsaw Pact: Intrabloc Conflicts, Kent State University Press, 2008
Dionysios Chourchoulis, The Southern Flank of NATO, 1951–1959: Military Strategy or Political Stabilization, PhD thesis, Queen Mary University of London, 2010
Yiannis P. Roubatis, Tangled Webs (LANDSOUTHEAST was responsible for the land defence of Greece for a period through an advanced HQ in Thessaloniki)
Simon Duke, Wolfgang Krieger, U.S. Military Forces in Europe: The Early Years, 1945–1970, Westview Special Studies in International Security, Westview Press, 1993

External links 
 

Formations of the NATO Military Command Structure 1994–present
Military units and formations established in 2012
Military in İzmir Province
NATO installations in Turkey